Healthcare in the State of Palestine refers to the governmental and private healthcare providers to which residents in the claimed territory have access. Since 1967, there have been improvements in the access to healthcare and the overall general health conditions for residents. Advances in training, increased access to state-of-the-art medical technology, and various governmental provisions have allowed per-capita funding to increase, and therefore the overall health of residents in the region to increase. Additionally, the enhanced access to and funding from international organizations like the World Health Organization, the United Nations, the Palestinian Ministry of Health, and the World Bank Education and Health Rehabilitation Project have contributed to the current state of affairs within the healthcare segment of the Palestinian territories. However, while many efforts at enhancing the state of health affairs within the Palestinian territories have shown improvement, there are still efforts to be made.  Continued efforts to recognize and address the geopolitical barriers will be necessary in order to continue to have significant success in this field.  Finally, addressing demographic trends within the region, like differing pregnancy rates and mortality rates, will be necessary to enhance the state of health affairs that the Palestinian territories face. This article addresses each of these issues in more explanatory detail, giving an overview of the major legal and ethical developments in healthcare within the Palestinian territories, and discussing further obstacles that the region faces due to infrastructural and political barriers.

The Human Rights Measurement Initiative finds that Palestine is fulfilling 83.8% of what it should be fulfilling for the right to health based on its level of income. When looking at the right to health with respect to children, Palestine achieves 97.4% of what is expected based on its current income. In regards to the right to health amongst the adult population, the country achieves 95.4% of what is expected based on the nation's level of income. Palestine falls into the "very bad" category when evaluating the right to reproductive health because the nation is fulfilling only 58.7% of what the nation is expected to achieve based on the resources (income) it has available.

Relevant historical information

Oslo Accords and the establishment of the PNA 

Between 1993 and 1995, the State of Israel and the Palestine Liberation Organization (PLO) reached a series of pacts collectively known as the Oslo Accords. The accords were facilitated by the international community, led by the United States and the Russian Federation.  The accords established an autonomous Palestinian National Authority (PNA) that could administer the occupied territories. The accords transferred jurisdiction over Palestinians living in the Gaza Strip and the West Bank from Israel to the PNA, whose charter calls for the creation of a democratically elected Legislative Council that could write laws pertaining to the economic, security, educational and health care needs of Gaza and West Bank Palestinians.

Establishment of the PNA’s Ministry of Health 

Since 1967, a division of the Israeli Military known as the Health Department of the Civil Administration (HDCA) had been responsible for overseeing health care in the occupied territories. During this time, HDCA’s work was greatly supported by three other major sources of health care: Non-governmental organizations, the UN, and the private sector.

Shortly after Oslo I and the corresponding transfer of jurisdiction, the PNA established a Ministry of Health (MOH) to administrate healthcare in Gaza and the West Bank.

De facto secession of Gaza from the PNA 

Until 2007, PNA healthcare policy was fully exercisable in both the West Bank and the Gaza Strip. However, in the 2007 Battle of Gaza, Hamas militias forcibly expelled all rivals from Gaza, bringing Gaza firmly under Hamas control.  Hence, as of 2007, the PNA’s control does not extend to Gaza de facto. Despite its lack of de facto control, the PNA still contributes financially to health care in Gaza by assisting with salaries of some health officials and sending medical supplies.

Legal basis 
According to the World Bank, the two documents comprising the legal framework of PNA health care are the 2003 Palestinian Constitution and the 2004 Public Health Law. In its articles concerning health care, the constitution requires that the PNA regulate health insurance and guarantees health care to the following classes of people: the injured, prisoners of war, families of dead resistance fighters, and the disabled. Additionally, the 2004 Public Health Law spans 13 chapters and 85 provisions, and covers issues such as women and children’s health, combating disease, environmental health, and public health infrastructure. Importantly, the law requires the MOH to offer certain types of health services to Palestinians including preventative, diagnostic, curative, rehabilitative and emergency care. In addition to establishing the MOH as the governmental source of health care provision, the law assigns the ministry responsibility for regulating the other three health care sectors.

Major sources of health care and health expenditure in the Palestinian territories

Public sector 

Through its Ministry of Health (MOH), the PNA provides health services to Palestinians under its jurisdiction in accordance with the Constitution and the Public Health Law. Additionally, the PNA government insurance plan is the principal insurance provider in the PNA run territories. Since the ascendancy of the Hamas government in Gaza, the PNA’s MOH no longer serves a governmental function in Gaza healthcare, having been replaced by Hamas. The majority of funding for MOH services emanates from foreign aid and taxes. Public sector spending represents about 32% of health care expenditure in the Palestinian territories.

UNRWA sector 

Since its inception in 1948, UNRWA has had jurisdiction over the social services of Palestinian refugees . The organization has money in its budget (which is determined by the UN) to provide free health services to eligible Palestinians living in the West Bank and in Gaza provided that they are registered as refugees. As of 2012, the UNRWA provides health services to 727,471 people in the West Bank through some 42 primary health centers and to 1,167,572 Gazans through 21 Primary Health centers. The UNRWA finances about 24% of all health care spending in Palestine.

NGO sector 

Palestinian Non-Governmental Organizations (NGOs) bankrolled by private benefactors encompass a sizable portion of the health care economy in the PNA. A World Bank survey found that 11.7% of Palestinians used NGOs most frequently for their health needs. 13.3% of households in the West Bank relied on NGOs compared to 8.1% of households in Gaza. The World Bank report explained that fewer NGOs operate in Gaza than in the West Bank and that Gaza residents are more likely to be classified as refugees and therefore to have access to services provided by UNRWA. Palestinians are most likely to visit NGOs when they require mental health counseling, physical therapy and rehabilitation, and medical training and they are least likely to use NGOs for emergency care, routine check-ups, and maternity and pediatric needs. The Department for International Development, a British government agency, found that a visit to an NGO-run primary health clinic cost twice as much as a visit to a government clinic and four times as much as a visit to a UNRWA facility. In 2004, DFID reported that NGOs employed 33% of workers in the Palestinian health sector, while the Palestinian Central Bureau of Statistics put the figure at 26% in 2005. In 2003, Palestinian NGOs received $54 million from donors, out of about $240 million donated for healthcare in the Palestinian territories.

Private sector 

The private health care space has grown in recent years with the advent of privately held hospitals, pharmacies, laboratories, and rehabilitation centers. A nascent pharmaceutical industry has also developed, which is able to supply about one half of total Palestinian demand for prescription medicine.  Some private health insurance programs have been established, though with limited popularity. Many Palestinians with means self-pay for health services not available to them through other avenues and private expenditure comprises roughly 37% of all spending on health care in Gaza and the West Bank.

Data about the Current Healthcare System in the Palestinian Territories 

To provide an informative overview of the current state of healthcare within the Palestinian Territories, some statistical information about the current system will provide greater clarity on the state of affairs.  Currently, the Palestinian territories have approximately sixty hospitals and medical centers within the region, with numerous other medical research institutes pursuing initiatives on various medical advances including issues like cancer and Parkinson’s Disease treatments, as well as stem-cell research. However, the Palestinians lack a fundamental and substantive primary care system that can reach out to the local population.  Infrastructural challenges restrict the movement of physicians and medical supplies, and lack of efficient logistics prevents a coordinated effort by all healthcare service providers to provide the necessary primary care. Because all medicines must be sourced through Israel, the PA is unable to take advantage of lower prices often available in Arab countries.

The ongoing COVID-19 pandemic emerged in the State of Palestine on 5 March 2020. Currently, 7.32% of the population within the recognized State of Palestine have received COVID-19 vaccinations, which is a total 4.21% below the global average of 11.53% and 55.76% below the State of Israel's total vaccination of 63.08%, drawing praise to Israel's "successful COVID-19 vaccine program". Such praise has been met with severe criticism by human rights organizations, citing Article 56 of the Fourth Geneva Convention, which states that "the Occupying Power has the duty of ensuring and maintaining, with the cooperation of national and local authorities, the medical and hospital establishments and services, public health and hygiene in the occupied territory, with particular reference to the adoption and application of the prophylactic and preventive measures necessary to combat the spread of contagious diseases and epidemics." However, the recent escalation of violence between Israel and Hamas between 10 May 2021 to 11 May 2021 exacerbated this disparity by spiking cases in Gaza after Israel's bombardment of Gaza's "central testing laboratory for COVID-19 at Rimal Clinic"; of over 2,300 housing units, driving 77,000 new Palestinians of Gaza into internal displacement and thus homelessness, further exacerbating the overcrowded conditions of Gaza; and through the 16 May 2021 Israeli airstrikes of the residential building, which resulted in the killing of Dr. Ayman Abu al-Auf, physician chief of internal medicine at Gaza's Al-Shifa Hospital, where he also served as the director of coronavirus response efforts.

While an immunization policy for Palestinian infants has recently been implemented, a policy for young adults and adults does not exist. According to the World Bank, only 44  percent of all Palestinians have access to "reasonable and customary" healthcare. In other words, only 44 percent of all Palestinians have access to all of the treatment that they should.  This leaves a startling 56 percent of the population with access to little or no healthcare whatsoever. 

The Palestinian Authority and the Vital Statistics Records in the Palestinian Territories records births in the region, and recent research suggests that the fertility rate of Palestinians is nearly at an all-time historical high.  In fact, 46% of the population is under 15 years of age.  These demographic shifts present interesting challenges and opportunities to the healthcare system in the Palestinian Territories. While there is a socialized healthcare system within the Palestinian Territories that provides universal and compulsory enrollment for all citizens, the healthcare provided in this universal plan is far below the normal standard of care accorded to healthy individuals. These inadequate healthcare provisions, along with improper preventative care and lifestyle choices, contribute to the four primary causes of death within the region, which include cardiovascular disease, cancer, cerebrovascular disease, and diabetes.

Among Palestinians aged 15–64 years, 58% of them are overweight, 36% have high levels of cholesterol, and 8.5% have diabetes mellitus.  Additional contributors to poor health include a large prevalence, 38% in fact, of men who smoke and a startling 75% of Palestinians who do not engage in any vigorous physical activity at all. The Palestinian National Health Strategy attempts to address and mitigate these health issues within the region by suggesting to citizens appropriate diet and exercise routines, providing good governance and leadership in overseeing and regulating the Palestinian health sector, and providing a framework for citizens to have access to and receive high quality, safe health care. Further advances within the Palestinian healthcare sector, however, are necessary to make more meaningful contributions.

Major challenges

Barriers to access 

A 2012 article in The Lancet says the Israeli Military's blockade of the Gaza Strip as a major health challenge.  Hospitals in the West Bank and in Gaza are sometimes not equipped to deal with more advanced medical problems and procedures. In such cases, doctors will refer their patients to more sophisticated treatment centers in Israel. Such treatment is often delayed by the Israeli bureaucratic process which has to approve requests. Ambulances traveling from the Palestinian territories to hospitals in east Jerusalem are often delayed or denied at security checkpoints.
Moreover, within the West Bank, mobility is limited as residents must pass through Israeli checkpoints in order to travel in between various West Bank cities.  This means that West Bank residents have trouble accessing health care providers located in other nearby West Bank towns. The limited mobility has even more serious ramifications in emergency situations wherein ambulances traveling in between West Bank towns experience delays.

According to the WHO, the residents of Gaza are in a particularly precarious position given Israeli tensions with the de facto Hamas government. Hamas claims that Israel has severely obstructed the flow of goods to that region since 2007, preventing the importation of essential medical equipment and prescription drugs. In recent years, periodic battles between Hamas militants and the Israeli Military have resulted in much damage to the medical infrastructure in Gaza which cannot be readily repaired due to limitations on the amounts of construction material being imported to the region. According to the Israeli government, it has imposed no restrictions whatever on medical supplies and equipment since 2010. In any case, supplies could be imported through Gaza's border with Egypt.
Additionally, Palestinian officials maintain that the quality of health care professionals in Gaza has been hampered as they are often not permitted to travel abroad to conventions and training sessions where they can advance their skills and knowledge.

Lack of control over Gaza 

Besides the problems posed by the conflict with Israel, a major challenge to health care in the PNA territories is the fact that the PNA is currently not at liberty to physically implement policy in Gaza. Currently, the extent of its involvement in Gaza health care is limited to the financial contributions it makes there.

Reforms: The National Health Strategy 

Though the challenges above stem largely from the geo-political reality facing the PNA, the PNA believes that there are certain areas for which progress is under its direct control and attainable. These areas have been identified in the MOH's recently issued National Health Strategy, which was assembled in conjunction with representatives from the aforementioned major "sectors" of the Palestinian health system. The ideas set forth in this document currently serve as the basis of reform. It is important to note that the PNA believes that the future policies inherent in its National Health Strategy also apply to Gazans, in spite of Hamas’ de facto control of the region. Per the Oslo Accords, the PNA still maintains de jure jurisdiction over the people of Gaza and the PNA hopes to implement in Gaza the same reforms underway in the West Bank at such a time as this would be possible. However, the National Health Strategy makes no mention of the refugees living in Jordan, Lebanon and Syria as the Oslo Accords maintain these individuals under UNRWA jurisdiction until final negotiations can determine their status. Hence, the plan does not take into account a potential future resettlement of refugees.

Health financing 
The PNA has identified government expenditure on health care to be unsustainable in the long term absent alterations in financing mechanisms. Approximately 30.5% of those enjoying health care provisions from the government do not currently pay into the system, causing the PNA to incur debt or rely on donations to cover the difference. Moreover, in recent years, participation in the government’s health plan has been on the decline, leaving the MOH with fewer revenues. In response, the PNA is currently considering adopting a single-payer health care system whereby all Palestinian residents under its de facto jurisdiction will be mandated to purchase insurance from the government. Currently, mandates to purchase the PNA's insurance extend only to civil servants and retirees. The PNA hopes that a universal scheme will stabilize revenues and reduce inefficiencies. To meet the new demands that universal coverage would place on the system, the PNA will first have to make substantial investments in the MOH’s administrative capabilities.

Health informatics 
The WHO has described the PNA’s Health Information System (HIS) as "incomplete, fragmented, unreliable, and outdated". With $86 Million in assistance from the United States Agency for International Development (USAID), the PNA plans to upgrade its HIS from paper based to electronic, the first such system in the Arab Middle East. A central database is to provide computerized and up to date information on matters such as medical professionals, patient medical records, and prescription drug use. In addition to streamlining information on individual patients across all medical facilities, the data gathered will be used for research, enabling the medical community to pinpoint health trends and incidence of disease more accurately than ever before.

See also
 Health in the State of Palestine
 List of hospitals in the State of Palestine

References